KBME may refer to:

 KBME-TV, a television station (channel 22) licensed to Bismarck, North Dakota, United States
 KBME (AM), a radio station (790 AM) licensed to Houston, Texas, United States